"I Don't Want to Be with Nobody but You" is a song originally recorded by Dorothy Moore for her 1976 album Misty Blue. It was written by Eddie Floyd, who recorded his own version in 2008 for the album Eddie Loves You So. Australian band Absent Friends covered the song for their 1990 debut album, Here's Looking Up Your Address, featuring Wendy Matthews on lead vocals and Peter Blakeley on backing vocals.

Absent Friends' version was released in April 1990 as the third single from Here's Looking Up Your Address and debuted on the Australian Singles Chart at  45 in May 1990, eventually peaking at No. 4 in July 1990. It won the Single of the Year award at the 1991 ARIA Music Awards. Matthews subsequently included it on her 1999 greatest hits album, Stepping Stones and on her 2007 compilation album, The Essential Wendy Matthews.

Track listings

Charts

Weekly charts

Year-end charts

Sales and certifications

Other versions
The song has also been covered by Stevie Salas on the album The Electric Pow Wow (1993), Anne Robertson on the Australian Idol - The Final 13 CD (2005) and by Joss Stone on her 2012 album, The Soul Sessions Vol. 2.

References

1976 songs
1990 singles
ARIA Award-winning songs
Dorothy Moore songs
Eddie Floyd songs
Songs written by Eddie Floyd
Wendy Matthews songs